Cecily Neville, Duchess of Warwick, Countess of Worcester (c.1425 – 26 July 1450) was a daughter of Richard Neville, 5th Earl of Salisbury and Alice Montacute, 5th Countess of Salisbury. Her siblings included Richard Neville, 16th Earl of Warwick; John Neville, 1st Marquess of Montagu; George Neville, (Archbishop of York and Chancellor of England); Katherine Neville, Baroness Hastings; and Alice Neville, Baroness FitzHugh.

Life
She was most likely named after her paternal aunt, Cecily Neville, Duchess of York. Her first cousins included Anne of York, Duchess of Exeter; Edmund, Earl of Rutland; Elizabeth of York, Duchess of Suffolk; Margaret of York; George Plantagenet, 1st Duke of Clarence; and Kings Edward IV and Richard III.

She first married Henry de Beauchamp, 1st Duke of Warwick, and the only King of the Isle of Wight (as well as of Jersey and Guernsey). Their only daughter was Lady Anne Beauchamp, who was allowed to succeed as suo jure 15th Countess of Warwick. Upon the death of the 15th Countess, the title was inherited by her paternal aunt, also named Lady Anne. Lady Anne married Cecily's brother, Richard Neville, who would become jure uxoris 16th Earl of Warwick.

Her second husband was John Tiptoft, 1st Earl of Worcester. They had no children.

She is buried with her first husband, the Duke of Warwick, in Tewkesbury Abbey.

Ancestry

References

, 

1420s births
1450 deaths
Warwick
Worcester
Daughters of British earls
Cecily
Burials at Tewkesbury Abbey
15th-century English women
15th-century English people